Arthur R. Winters Sr. (1900 – May 9, 1981) was an American football, basketball, and track and field coach and college athletics administrator. He served as the head football coach at Hamilton College in Clinton, New York from 1927 to 1940, compiling a record of 41–50–12. He was head basketball coach at Lafayette College in Easton, Pennsylvania from 1942 to 1945 and school's head track coach from 1942 to 1966. He also served as the athletic director at Lafayette from 1960 to 1965. Winters was born in Horton, Kansas.  He died on May 9, 1981, in  Allentown, Pennsylvania.

Head coaching record

Football

References

External links
 

1900 births
1981 deaths
Basketball coaches from Kansas
Case Western Spartans track and field coaches
Hamilton Continentals football coaches
Lafayette Leopards athletic directors
Lafayette Leopards men's basketball coaches
Oberlin College alumni
People from Horton, Kansas